Sysoyevsky is a rural locality (a khutor) and the administrative center of Sysoyevskoye Rural Settlement, Surovikinsky District, Volgograd Oblast, Russia. The population was 588 as of 2010. There are 10 streets.

Geography 
Sysoyevsky is located 25 km south of Surovikino (the district's administrative centre) by road. Posyolok otdeleniya 2 sovkhoza Krasnaya Zvezda is the nearest rural locality.

References 

Rural localities in Surovikinsky District